Mahdi Mohammadian (born March 5, 1997) is an Iranian goalkeeper who last played for Iranian club Tractor in the Iran Pro League.

References

1997 births
Living people
Tractor S.C. players
Iranian footballers
Association football goalkeepers